The International Vedanta Society (or IVS) is a spiritual organization in India focused on Advaita Vedanta. It is based in Birati, West Bengal, India, and was founded in 1989 by Sri Bhagavan.

See also
 Ramakrishna Mission
 Vedanta Society

References

External links
 International Vedanta Society Official website
 

Advaita Vedanta
Hindu organizations
Religious organisations based in India
Organisations based in West Bengal
North 24 Parganas district
Religious organizations established in 1989
1989 establishments in West Bengal